Fiona Hamilton-Fairley  (born 1963) is the founder and CEO of The Kids' Cookery School in Acton, West London. She founded the cookery school for children in 1995 and she has authored three books. She was appointed a Member of the Order of the British Empire in 2019.

Career
After completing a Cordon Bleu course, Hamilton-Fairley worked as a chef, and founded and managed her own catering company, Corporate Catering Company.  Hamilton-Fairley's vocation for teaching cookery was sparked in 1987 when she began to teach adults how to cook in a number of adult educational centres in London boroughs.

The Kids' Cookery School 
Hamilton-Fairley founded The Kids' Cookery School (KCS) in 1995, raising funds to build the purpose-built teaching kitchens in Acton, West London. Children aged 3-16 years old attend for practical cookery lessons, where they learn to cook healthy food from fresh ingredients. Almost 13, 000 children a year are taught at The Kids' Cookery School. The goal of the school is to teach children healthy choices and teach them valuable life skills. Hamilton-Fairley learned that a majority of parents believed teaching children cooking skills is important, however very few actually have the time to teach their own children.

KCS offers assisted places and includes children who are disengaged with or excluded from education, or who have disabilities or special needs. The main focus is on savoury food that children will eat, with instruction in safety and familiarity with raw ingredients.

In 2009, Hamilton-Fairley's Kids' Cookery School started 'KCS on wheels'. Experienced chefs are sent to communities to bring cooking to children who otherwise might not experience the school.

In 2018, Hamilton-Fairley continued to advocate for children learning to cook. She has said that for two decades children were not taught to cook is schools and now they are a generation that lives on junk food. Hamilton-Fairley has been called a children's cooking expert.

Funding
The school is a registered charity and relies on donations from charitable trusts, companies, individuals and government.

Awards
 2002 - The Guardian Charity Award 
 2015 - The Halifax Giving Extra Award 
 2019 - MBE "for services to Children with Special Educational Needs and Disabilities".

Books
I Can’t Cook (1993) By Fiona Hamilton-Fairley, Bloomsbury Press  Hardcover (United Kingdom) 24 June 1993;  Paperback (United Kingdom) 26 August 1994 
I Can’t Cook: Entertaining (1995) By Fiona Hamilton-Fairley, Bloomsbury Press  Hardcover (United Kingdom) 24 August 1995 
The Kids' Cook Book (2005) By Fiona Hamilton-Fairley, Self-published
Little Cooks: 30 Delicious Recipes to Make and Enjoy (1 April 2008) By Fiona Hamilton-Fairley, New Holland Publishers

External links 
 Order of the British Empire – official website of the British Monarchy
Huffington Post Article written by Fiona Hamilton-Fairley

References 

1963 births
Living people
English chefs
British children's writers
British women children's writers
Education in the London Borough of Ealing
Cooking schools in the United Kingdom
Education in London